Alina Alekseevna Charaeva (born 27 May 2002) is a Russian tennis player.

Charaeva has a career-high singles ranking by the Women's Tennis Association (WTA) of 317, achieved on 8 November 2021. She also has a career-high WTA doubles ranking of 227, achieved on 7 March 2022. Charaeva has won four singles and four doubles titles on the ITF Women's Circuit.

She made her WTA Tour main-draw debut at the 2019 Kremlin Cup, having received a wildcard into the doubles event, partnering Sofya Lansere.

ITF Circuit finals

Singles: 5 (4 titles, 1 runner–up)

Doubles: 4 (4 titles)

Junior Grand Slam finals

Singles

Doubles

References

External links
 
 

2002 births
Living people
Russian female tennis players
21st-century Russian women